The following is a list of those who have served as foreign ministers of Armenia.

See also
 Foreign relations of Armenia
 List of ambassadors of Armenia
 List of diplomatic missions in Armenia
 List of diplomatic missions of Armenia
 List of Ministers of Foreign Affairs of the Republic of Artsakh
 Ministry of Foreign Affairs (Armenia)
 Minister of Foreign Affairs (Republic of Artsakh)

References

 https://web.archive.org/web/20180623202938/http://mfa.am/en/ministry

Foreign Affairs
Government of Armenia
 
Armenia
1918 establishments in Armenia